Bobby Duncan (born 27 April 1945) is a Scottish footballer who is most well known for playing for Hibernian. The highlight of his career was scoring a goal against Napoli in the UEFA Cup in 1967.

He played club football for Bonnyrigg Rose Athletic, Hibernian and East Fife.

References

1945 births
Living people
Scottish footballers
Association football defenders
East Fife F.C. players
Hibernian F.C. players
Bonnyrigg Rose Athletic F.C. players
Scottish Football League players
Scottish Junior Football Association players